Pseudanarta daemonalis is a species of cutworm or dart moth in the family Noctuidae. It is found in North America.

The MONA or Hodges number for Pseudanarta daemonalis is 9613.

References

Further reading

 
 
 

Xylenini
Articles created by Qbugbot
Moths described in 1941